This is a list of host cities of the Olympic Games, both summer and winter, since the modern Olympics began in 1896. Since then, summer and winter games have usually celebrated a four-year period known as an Olympiad; summer and winter games normally held in staggered even years. There have been 29  Summer Olympic Games held in 23 cities, and 24 Winter Olympic Games held in 21 cities. In addition, three summer and two winter editions of the games were scheduled to take place but later cancelled due to war: Berlin (summer) in 1916; Sapporo–Garmisch-Partenkirchen (winter) and Tokyo–Helsinki (summer) in 1940; and Cortina d'Ampezzo (winter) and London (summer) in 1944. The 1906 Intercalated Olympics were officially sanctioned and held in Athens. However, in 1949, the International Olympic Committee (IOC) decided to unrecognize the 1906 Games. The 2020 Summer Olympics in Tokyo were postponed for the first time in the Olympics history to summer 2021 due to the COVID-19 pandemic with the 2022 Winter Olympics being held roughly six months later in Beijing.

Four cities have been chosen by the IOC to host upcoming Olympic Games: Paris for the 2024 Summer Olympics, Milan–Cortina d'Ampezzo for the 2026 Winter Olympics, Los Angeles for the 2028 Summer Olympics, and Brisbane for the 2032 Summer Olympics.

In 2022, Beijing became the first city that has held both the summer and the winter Olympic Games. Ten cities will have hosted the Olympic Games more than once: Athens (1896 and 2004 Summer Olympics), Paris (1900, 1924 and 2024 Summer Olympics), London (1908, 1948 and 2012 Summer Olympics), St. Moritz (1928 and 1948 Winter Olympics), Lake Placid (1932 and 1980 Winter Olympics), Los Angeles (1932, 1984 and 2028 Summer Olympics), Cortina d'Ampezzo (1956 and 2026 Winter Olympics), Innsbruck (1964 and 1976 Winter Olympics), Tokyo (1964 and 2020 Summer Olympics) and Beijing (2008 Summer Olympics and 2022 Winter Olympics). Stockholm hosted the 1912 Summer Olympics and the equestrian portion of the 1956 Summer Olympics. London became the first city to have hosted three Games with the 2012 Summer Olympics. Paris will become the second city to do this with the 2024 Summer Olympics, followed by Los Angeles as the third in 2028.

The Games have primarily been hosted in the regions of Europe (30 editions) and the Americas (13 editions); eight Games have been hosted in Asia and two have been hosted in Oceania. Rio de Janeiro became South America's first Olympic host city with the 2016 Summer Olympics. Africa has yet to host an Olympic Games. Other major geographic regions which have never hosted the Olympics include the Middle East, Central Asia, the Indian subcontinent, Southeast Asia, the South Pacific, Central America and the Caribbean. Between the first Winter Olympics in 1924 and the last ones to be held in the same year as the Summer Olympics in 1992, the Summer and Winter games took place in the same country three times.

Host cities are selected by the IOC membership, usually seven years in advance. The selection process lasts approximately two years. In the first stage, any city in the world may submit an application to become a host city. After 10 months, the Executive Board of the IOC decides which applicant cities will become official candidates as based on the recommendation of a working group that reviews the applications. In a second stage, the candidate cities are investigated thoroughly by an Evaluation Commission, which then submits a final short list of cities to be considered for selection. The host city is then chosen by vote of the IOC session, a general meeting of IOC members.

Olympic Games host cities

Host cities for Summer and Winter Olympic Games 
Key
 Cancelled
 Postponed

 The 1906 Intercalated Games are no longer officially recognized by the IOC as an official Olympic Games.

Host cities for multiple Summer and Winter Olympic Games

Number of Olympic Games by country

Number of Olympic Games by region

See also
List of bids for the Summer Olympics
List of bids for the Winter Olympics

Notes

References

External links
 

Host Cities
Olympic Games
Cities